Joop is a Dutch masculine given name, often a short form (hypocorism) of Johannes, Joseph, Jacobus, or other names. It may refer to:

 Jogchum T. Joop Alberda (born 1952), Dutch volleyball coach, coach of the 1996 Olympic champion Dutch team
 Johannes J. Joop Atsma (born 1956), Dutch politician
 Johannes Joop Ave (1934–2014), Indonesian government minister
 Johannes A. Joop Bakker (1921-2003), Dutch politician
 Josephus Joop Beek (1917-1983), Dutch-born  Indonesian Jesuit, priest, educator and politician
 Johannes J. Joop Beljon (1922-2002), Dutch artist
 Joop Böckling (born 1955), Dutch footballer
 Johannes W. Joop Boutmy (1894–1972), Dutch footballer
 Johannes F. Joop Braakhekke (1941–2016), Dutch chef, restaurateur, television presenter and author
 Joop Brand (born 1936), Dutch former football player and manager
 Johannes Joop Cabout (1927–2013), Dutch water polo player
 Johan R. Joop Carp (1897–1962), Dutch sailor, helmsman of the 1920 Olympic 6.4 Metre champion
 Johannes C. Joop van Daele (born 1947), Dutch former footballer
 Johannes J. Joop Demmenie (1918–1991), Dutch cyclist
 Johan H. Joop Doderer (1921–2005), Dutch actor
 Joop van Domselaar (1928–2006), Dutch sports shooter
 Joop Donkervoort (born 1949), Dutch businessman
 Jan L. Joop van Dort (1889-1967), Dutch footballer
 Johannes A. Joop van den Ende (born 1942), Dutch theatrical producer
 Jozef P. Joop Eversteijn (1921–2013), Dutch footballer
 Johannes J.M. Joop Falke (1933–2016), Dutch artist and goldsmith
 Joop Gall (born 1963), Dutch football manager and former player
 Johannes M. Joop Geurts (1923–2009), Dutch baseball player
 Johann G. Joop Glimmerveen (1928-2022), Dutch neo-Nazi
 Job Johannes Joop Gouweleeuw (1940–2017), Dutch judoka 
 Joseph C.E. Joop Haex (1911-2002), Dutch politician, lieutenant general and twice State Secretary for Defence
 Johannes J.F. Joop Harmans (1921–2015), Dutch cyclist
 Johannes Joop van der Heide (1917-1980), Dutch footballer
 Johannes F. Joop Hiele (born 1958), Dutch former football goalkeeper
 Josephus J.C.M. Joop Hox (born 1949), Dutch psychologist and professor
 Joop Kasteel (born 1964), Dutch martial artist
 Johannes H.B. Joop Kemperman (1924–2011), Dutch mathematician
 Jacobus J. Joop Klant (1915–1994), Dutch economist and novelist
 Johannes H. Joop Knottenbelt (1910–1998), Dutch tennis player
 Joseph W. Joop Kolkman (1896–1944), Dutch journalist and diplomat
 Johan M. Joop Langhorst (1943–2013), Dutch footballer
 Jacob Joop Lankhaar (born 1966), Dutch footballer
 Johannes C. Joop van Nellen (1910-1992), Dutch footballer
 Joop van Oosterom (1937–2016), Dutch billionaire and twice correspondence chess world champion
 Jozef J.L. Joop Pelser (1892–1974), Dutch footballer
 Johannes Joop Post (born 1950), Dutch businessman
 Josephus Th. Joop Puntman (1934–2013), Dutch ceramist and sculptor
 Johannes P. Joop van der Reijden (1927–2006), Dutch politician
 Joannes B. Joop Roeland (1931–2010), Dutch priest and environmental activist 
 Johannes J. Joop Rohner (1927–2005), Dutch water polo player
 Joop Sanders (born 1921), Dutch-born American Abstract Expressionist painter
 Johannes H. Joop Stoffelen (1921-2005), Dutch footballer
 Joop Stokkel (born 1967), Dutch equestrian
 Johannes A. Joop Stokkermans (1937–2012), Dutch composer and pianist
 Johannes M. Joop den Uyl (1919-1987), Dutch politician
 Johannes A. Joop Vermeulen (1907–1984), Dutch long-distance runner
 Joop Voorn (born 1932), Dutch composer
 Jacob F. Joop Warouw (1917–1960), military officer involved in the Indonesian National Revolution
 Johan C.D. Joop van Werkhoven (born 1950), Dutch Olympic sailor
 Johan G. Joop Westerweel (1899–1944), Dutch World War II resistance leader
 Joop van Wijk (born 1950), Dutch documentary film director
 Joannes G. Joop Wijn (born 1969), former Minister of Economic Affairs of the Netherlands
 Joop Wilhelmus (1943–1994), Dutch pornographer
 Johan G. Joop Wille (1920–2009), Dutch footballer
 Johannes J. Joop van Woerkom (1912–1998), Dutch water polo player
 Josephus W. Joop Zalm (1897–1969), Dutch weightlifter
 Joop Zeegers (born 2004), Dutch personal trainer and Rocketleague player
 H. G. Jozef Joop Zoetemelk (born 1946), Dutch racing cyclist, winner of the 1980 Tour de France and the 1979 Vuelta a España
Fictional character
Joop ter Heul, female eponymous protagonist of a series of books and a movie

See also
Jaap (given name)
Joep

Dutch masculine given names
Hypocorisms